"Bobby's Girl" is a song and single written by Gary Klein and Henry Hoffman.  The original was performed by American teenage singer Marcie Blane, and became a #3 hit on the US charts.  A near-simultaneous cover by British singer Susan Maughan was the hit in the UK, coincidentally also reaching #3 on the UK charts.  Both Blane and Maughan are one-hit wonders; for both these artists, "Bobby's Girl" marked their only appearance on a national top 40 chart.

Marcie Blane version 
Blane's version of the song was released in the United States in August, 1962. It has a spoken introduction and a backing refrain of "You're not a kid anymore" and was popular with the American teenage audience. It entered the charts in October and made the Top 10 within a month reaching 3 on the Billboard Hot 100 by December, where it stayed for four weeks. It reached 2 on the Cash Box chart staying on the charts for nineteen weeks and made Blane (very briefly) the top selling female singer in the US.

Chart history

Weekly charts

Year-end charts

Susan Maughan version 

Susan Maughan's cover version was released in the UK, also in 1962. It featured Wally Stott and his orchestra and chorus. Substantially re-arranged from Blane's original, Maughan's version dropped the spoken word intro, and had a more sophisticated, less 'teen-age' sound.  It spent nineteen weeks on the UK's Record Retailer chart, peaking at No. 3.

Chart history

Other versions
In 1963 Swedish artist Lil Malmkvist made a version in German (Ariola AT 10 106).

Tracey Ullman version 
In 1983 Tracey Ullman released a version of "Bobby's Girl" on the album You Broke My Heart in 17 Places and as a single. Ullman's version reached No. 45 in West Germany.

Foreign-language versions 

1963 : French singer Arielle performed the French-language version Je n'aime que Bobby (I only love Bobby).
1972 : Canadian singer Mimi Hétu performed the French-language version Pardonne-moi (Forgive me).
1984 : French singer Douchka performed the French-language version Mon p'tit cœur (My little heart).

References

External links
 

1962 songs
1962 singles
American pop rock songs
Philips Records singles
Tracey Ullman songs